Purbi Joshi (born 19 August 1974) is an Indian television actress and voice-dubbing actress who speaks Hindi, comedian, performer and anchor of television shows.

Biography
Purbi Joshi is a daughter of actors Pravin Joshi and Sarita Joshi. She is a sister of Ketki Dave.

Television career 
In 1995, Purbi got her first break in the television show Faasle.

Purbi started her career as a model in commercials for brands like Happy Dent chewing gum, Nirma Washing Powder, and Thompson Television. She did lead role in Doordarshan TV series Dishayein. She did double role of twin sisters.

In 2008, she participated in Mr. & Miss TV, a celebrity talent competition which she won and was declared "Miss TV".  She is most well known for her association with the Comedy Circus. Purbi hosted several seasons of Comedy Circus and performed as a member of the principal cast.  Purbi was also a part of MTV India's first spoof film of the Bollywood franchise Dhoom in the television movie, Ghoom.

She appeared as a Gujarati Indian American working family lady in Metro Park.

Bollywood career 
She was also part of an ensemble cast in the independent film Dasvidaniya released in 2008. She made her major movie debut role in 2011 as the lead actress in Damadamm! on the big screen opposite Himesh Reshammiya, also lending her voice to the song, "Umrao Jaan" in the movie.

Filmography

Films

Television shows

Web series

References

External links 
 
 India Today
 The first web-site of the Indian serial Dishayen
 Purbi Joshi - Bio (interview)
 Purbi Joshi - Bio (Russian Version)

Indian television actresses
Indian voice actresses
Living people
Actresses from Mumbai
Actresses in Hindi television
21st-century Indian actresses
1974 births